This is a list of FM radio stations in the United States having call signs beginning with the letters KA through KC. Low-power FM radio stations, those with designations such as KAAD-LP, have not been included in this list.

KA--

KB--

KC--

See also
 North American call sign

FM radio stations in the United States by call sign (initial letters KA-KC)